Melinda Sward is an American actress. She is best known for her role as Pretty Crane on soap opera Passions (2007–2008).

Career 
She portrayed Pretty Crane on soap opera Passions from July 30, 2007 to June 30, 2008. She had guest roles on television series 90210, Supernatural, That 70's Show, JAG, One on One and Off Centre.

In 2011, she played Samantha in Subway's commercials.

Personal life

Sward was born in 1979 in Oakdale, California. Sward is married to Adam Roth.

Filmography

Film Roles

TV Roles

Commercials

References

External links

Living people
American soap opera actresses
American film actresses
American television actresses
Actresses from California
1979 births